The 2011 Men's Asian Individual Squash Championships is the men's edition of the 2011 Asian Individual Squash Championships, which serves as the individual Asian championship for squash players. The event took place in Peang in Malaysia from 26 to 30 April 2011. Mohd Nafiizwan Adnan won his first Asian Individual Championships title, defeating Ong Beng Hee in the final.

Seeds

Draw and results

Finals

Top half

Section 1

Section 2

Bottom half

Section 1

Section 2

See also
2011 Women's Asian Individual Squash Championships
Asian Individual Squash Championships

References

External links
Asian Individual Squash Championships 2011 SquashSite website

2011 in squash
2011 in Malaysian sport
Squash tournaments in Malaysia
Squash in Asia
International sports competitions hosted by Malaysia